The Ministry of Energy of Turkmenistan is a Cabinet Ministry in the Turkmenistan. Since 2015, the portfolio has been headed by Minister Charymurad Purchekov.

History 
According to the Decree of the President of Turkmenistan Gurbanguly Berdimuhamedov on July 7, 2012 "On creation of the Ministry of Energy of Turkmenistan" was the successor of the abolished department of the Ministry of Energy and Industry of Turkmenistan. By focusing on the power sector, the ministry will be able to deliver it more effective management and coordination. Before the agency faces the challenges of large-scale modernization of existing power generation capacity, the creation of new ones, to increase electricity export.

Ministers

References

External links 

Ministry of Energy

Turkmenistan
Energy
Turkmenistan, Energy
2012 establishments in Turkmenistan